Dzmitry Nikulenkau (born 12 July 1984) is a former Belarusian handball player for SKA Minsk and the Belarusian national team.

References

External links

1984 births
Living people
Belarusian male handball players
Sportspeople from Minsk
Expatriate handball players in Poland
Belarusian expatriate sportspeople in Poland
Vive Kielce players